Kiran (Khiraan) is a rural locality (a selo) in Kyakhtinsky District, Republic of Buryatia, Russia. The population was 187 as of 2010. There are 2 streets.

Geography 
Kiran is located 28 km east of Kyakhta (the district's administrative centre) by road. Kurort Kiran is the nearest rural locality.

References 

Rural localities in Kyakhtinsky District